Provability logic is a modal logic, in which the box (or "necessity") operator is interpreted as 'it is provable that'. The point is to capture the notion of a proof predicate of a reasonably rich formal theory, such as Peano arithmetic.

Examples
The basic system is generally referred to as GL (for Gödel–Löb) or L or K4W (W stands for well-foundedness). It can be obtained by adding the modal version of Löb's theorem to the logic K (or K4).

Namely, the axioms of GL are all tautologies of classical propositional logic plus all formulas of one of the following forms: 
 Distribution axiom: 
 Löb's axiom: 
And the rules of inference are:
 Modus ponens: From p → q and p conclude q;
 Necessitation: From  p conclude  .

History
The GL model was pioneered by Robert M. Solovay in 1976. Since then, until his death in 1996, the prime inspirer of the field was George Boolos. Significant contributions to the field have been made by Sergei N. Artemov, Lev Beklemishev, Giorgi Japaridze, Dick de Jongh, Franco Montagna, Giovanni Sambin, Vladimir Shavrukov, Albert Visser and others.

Generalizations
Interpretability logics and Japaridze's polymodal logic present natural extensions of provability logic.

See also
Hilbert–Bernays provability conditions
Interpretability logic
Kripke semantics
Japaridze's polymodal logic
Löb's theorem

References

George Boolos, The Logic of Provability. Cambridge University Press, 1993.
Giorgi Japaridze and Dick de Jongh, The logic of provability. In: Handbook of Proof Theory, S. Buss, ed. Elsevier, 1998, pp. 475–546.
Sergei N. Artemov and Lev Beklemishev, Provability logic. In: Handbook of Philosophical Logic, D. Gabbay and F. Guenthner, eds.,  vol. 13, 2nd ed., pp. 189–360. Springer, 2005.
Per Lindström, Provability logic—a short introduction. Theoria 62 (1996), pp. 19–61.
Craig Smoryński, Self-reference and modal logic. Springer, Berlin, 1985.
Robert M. Solovay, ``Provability Interpretations of Modal Logic``, Israel Journal of Mathematics, Vol. 25 (1976): 287–304.
Rineke Verbrugge, Provability logic, from the Stanford Encyclopedia of Philosophy.

 
Modal logic
Proof theory